= Newlandsville, West Virginia =

Newlandsville
- Unincorporated community
- Location within the state of West Virginia Newlandsville (the United States)
- Coordinates: 39°16′54″N 81°15′33″W
- Country: United States
- State: West Virginia
- County: Wood
- Elevation: 768 ft (234 m)
- Time zone: UTC-5 (Eastern (EST))
  - Summer (DST): UTC-4 (EDT)
- GNIS ID: 1552305

Newlandsville is an unincorporated community in Wood County, West Virginia, United States.
